Nancy Filteau (born 3 April 1962) is a Canadian judoka. She competed in the women's heavyweight event at the 1996 Summer Olympics.

See also
 Judo in Canada
 List of Canadian judoka

References

External links
 

1962 births
Living people
Canadian female judoka
Olympic judoka of Canada
Judoka at the 1996 Summer Olympics
People from Swift Current
Sportspeople from Saskatchewan
Pan American Games medalists in judo
Pan American Games bronze medalists for Canada
Judoka at the 1995 Pan American Games
Medalists at the 1995 Pan American Games
21st-century Canadian women
20th-century Canadian women